Thirteen at Dinner is a 1985 British-American made-for-television mystery film featuring the Belgian detective Hercule Poirot. Adapted by Rod Browning from the 1933 Agatha Christie novel Lord Edgware Dies, it was directed by Lou Antonio and starred Peter Ustinov, Faye Dunaway, Jonathan Cecil, Diane Keen, Bill Nighy and David Suchet, who was later to play Poirot in the long-running television series entitled Agatha Christie's Poirot. The film first aired on CBS Television on October 18, 1985.

Synopsis
Hercule Poirot appears on David Frost's talk show with actor Bryan Martin. The two are joined by Martin's costar Jane Wilkinson, who is later revealed to be a Wilkinson impersonator named Carlotta Adams. Adams' impression of Wilkinson is so perfect it fools Martin himself. Martin, Poirot, and Poirot's assistant Captain Arthur Hastings attend a dinner party, where the real Jane Wilkinson corners Poirot and asks for his help getting her a divorce from her husband, Lord Edgeware. Poirot agrees, only to discover that Lord Edgeware has already granted the divorce.

The next day, Lord Edgware is found dead. His staff insist that Wilkinson must have killed him, since she had threatened to once before. Inspector Japp is ready to arrest Wilkinson for the crime, but she has an alibi: she was at a dinner party with 12 other people. After Carlotta Adams is also murdered, Poirot investigates, much to Japp's annoyance. In the end, it is revealed that Jane Wilkinson did in fact murder her husband, hiring Adams to attend the dinner party in her stead in order to give herself an alibi. She then killed Adams to ensure her silence.

Cast
 Peter Ustinov as Hercule Poirot
 Faye Dunaway as Jane Wilkinson / Carlotta Adams
 Jonathan Cecil as Arthur Hastings
 Bill Nighy as Ronald Marsh
 Diane Keen as Jenny Driver
 David Suchet as Inspector James Japp
 John Stride as Film Director
 Benedict Taylor as Donald Ross
 Lee Horsley as Bryan Martin
 Allan Cuthbertson as Sir Montague Corner
 John Barron as Lord George Edgware
 Lesley Dunlop as Alice Bennett
 Avril Elgar as Miss Carroll
 Amanda Pays as Geraldine Marsh
 John Quarmby as Sir Montague's Butler
 Pamela Salem as Mrs. Wildburn
 Lou Antonio as Movie Producer
 David Frost as Himself
 Tony Hawks as Man in Background at party
 Sue Lloyd as Woman speaking in Background at a meeting (uncredited)

Production 
Thirteen At Dinner was the first of three television films featuring Sir Peter Ustinov as Hercule Poirot. All three were given contemporary settings, rather than being set in the era in which they were originally written. Ustinov had appeared as Poirot in two previous theatrical films after taking over the role from Albert Finney.

References

External links
 
 
 

1985 television films
1985 films
1980s mystery films
American mystery films
British television films
British mystery films
Television shows based on works by Agatha Christie
Films based on Hercule Poirot books
Films scored by John Addison
CBS network films
Warner Bros. films
Films directed by Lou Antonio
1980s English-language films
1980s American films
1980s British films